On 24 February 2022, the Chuhuiv Air Base in Chuhuiv, Kharkiv Oblast, Ukraine was the target of an air strike by Russian forces as part of the Northeastern Ukraine offensive during the 2022 Russian invasion of Ukraine.

Background 
Chuhuiv air base is located in the city of Chuhuiv in Kharkiv Oblast in Ukraine. The air base was capable of housing Baykar Bayraktar TB2 drones, as did the military airfields in Starokostyantyniv and Mykolaiv.

Attack 
In the opening hours of the Russian military invasion of Ukraine, a Russian missile attack targeted the Chuhuiv air base. Following the attack, the US-based space technologies' company Maxar published satellite images depicting damage resulting from the missile strike. According to open-source intelligence information, the attack left damage to fuel storage areas and other airport infrastructure. Also, at least five L-39 jet trainers, parked at the air base, were either destroyed or heavily damaged.

Later attacks 
On 10 April 2022, Russian officials claimed their forces targeted Ukrainian S-300 air defences present at Chuhuiv airbase.

References 

Northeastern Ukraine campaign
Battles of the 2022 Russian invasion of Ukraine
February 2022 events in Ukraine
Chuhuiv
History of Kharkiv Oblast
Airstrikes during the 2022 Russian invasion of Ukraine
Attacks on military installations in the 2020s